Lactarius villosus is a member of the large milk-cap genus Lactarius in the order Russulales. Found in Nebraska, the species was described in 1896 by Frederick Edward Clements.

See also
List of Lactarius species

References

External links

villosus
Fungi described in 1896
Fungi of North America